The 2008 NCAA Division I softball tournament was held from May 15 through June 4, 2008. 64 NCAA Division I college softball teams met after having played their way through a regular season, and for some, a conference tournament, to play in the NCAA Tournament.  The tournament culminated with eight teams playing in the 2008 Women's College World Series at ASA Hall of Fame Stadium in Oklahoma City, Oklahoma.

National seeds
Bold indicates WCWS participant.

Florida

Arizona State

Regionals and super regionals

Bold indicates winner. * indicates host.

Gainesville Super Regional

Houston Super Regional

College Station Super Regional

Ann Arbor Super Regional

Tuscaloosa Super Regional

Tempe Super Regional

Tucson Super Regional

Los Angeles Super Regional

Automatic bids

Women's College World Series

Participants

† Excludes results of the pre-NCAA Women's College World Series of 1969 through 1981.

Tournament notes
Florida and Virginia Tech were the first teams in their respective school histories to reach the WCWS in the NCAA era.

Results

Bracket

Game results

Championship game

Final standings

All Tournament Team
The following players were members of the All-Tournament Team:

Francesca Enea, Florida
Charlotte Morgan, Alabama
Stacey Nelson, Florida
Holly Tankersley, La.-Lafayette
Angela Tincher, Virginia Tech
Megan Gibson, Texas A&M
Jami Lobpries, Texas A&M
Kaitlin Cochran, Arizona State
Krista Donnenwirth, Arizona State
Lesley Rogers, Arizona State
Jackie Vasquez, Arizona State
Katie Burkhart, Arizona State (Most Outstanding Player)

WCWS records tied or broken
6,240 Session 1 (Games 1 and 2) total attendance — WCWS record
8,230 Session 3 (Games 5 and 6) total attendance — WCWS record
In Game 11, Florida left fielder Francesca Enea hit two home runs to allow her team to defeat Texas A&M 6–1. She tied the WCWS record for the most home runs in a game in the NCAA era that was set by UCLA's Yvonne Gutierrez in 1992 and tied by Arizona's Lindsey Collins in 1999 and UCLA's Andrea Harrison in 2010.
Arizona State's 11-0 victory over Texas A&M was the largest margin of victory in an NCAA championship clinching game.

Post-series notes
At the conclusion of their run in the series, Florida compiled a 70–5 overall record, becoming the first NCAA team to record 70 wins.
The 2008 WCWS marked the first time that Arizona did not return to the championship game/series while defending one of their eight national championships.

See also 
NCAA Division I Softball Championship

References

External links
Official NCAA bracket
Schedule/results at ESPN
NCAA Softball

NCAA Division I softball tournament
NCAA Division I softball tournament, 2008